John F. Emory (January 27, 1886 – December, 1968) was an American Negro league and Cuban League pitcher.

A native of Williamsport, Pennsylvania, Emory pitched for the Brooklyn Royal Giants in 1906, and for the Philadelphia Giants in 1909. In 1910, he played for Club Fé of the Cuban League. Emory died in Montoursville, Pennsylvania in 1968 at age 82.

References

External links
 and Seamheads

1886 births
1968 deaths
Date of death missing
Brooklyn Royal Giants players
Club Fé players
Philadelphia Giants players
Baseball pitchers
Baseball players from Pennsylvania
Sportspeople from Williamsport, Pennsylvania
American expatriate baseball players in Cuba
20th-century African-American people